Gymnopilus pholiotoides is a species of mushroom in the family Hymenogastraceae.

Description

Habitat and distribution
Gymnopilus pholiotoides grows on palm trunks in Cuba; fruit bodies have been found in May.

See also

List of Gymnopilus species

References

External links
Gymnopilus pholiotoides at Index Fungorum

pholiotoides
Fungi of North America
Taxa named by William Alphonso Murrill